André Bayssière (born 28 August 1943) is a French racing cyclist. He rode in the 1967 Tour de France.

References

1943 births
Living people
French male cyclists
Place of birth missing (living people)